Bilhete Único (Unified Ticket) is the name of the São Paulo transportation contactless smart card system for fare control.

Using Philips Mifare technology, the ticketing system is managed by SPTrans (São Paulo Transporte S/A), the city bus transportation authority, which is controlled by the municipal government. Tickets were first issued using the system on May 18, 2004, when Marta Suplicy was the mayor, allowing for up to four rides in two hours by paying a single fare on buses. From 2006 it has also been used in the local rapid transit system (São Paulo Metro) and on suburban railways operated by CPTM.

History
The original technical design (in about 1997) was based on Seoul's ticketing solution and provider. But the project was aborted, mostly due software problems with the complex Vale-Transporte regulation.

Around 2001/2002 the project was restarted by SPTrans under the title, Projeto de Bilhetagem Eletrônica. SPSTrans took on the role of Solution Integrator and Sponsor, choosing to have at least two providers for every supply and not to depend on a sole provider, as most other cities do.

Providers
Completion of the project resulted in the Bilhete Único, which has at least 30 different solution and service providers directly involved in the project.

The solution was a major gain solving the recharge problem: all cards are pre-paid, and recharge cannot be done on board. Other Brazilian cities failed on creating and spreading a large recharge network. Due to "win-win" agreements with Electronic Benefits Cards networks and the National Lottery network, São Paulo had over 6000 recharge points around the city by 2010.

Other software and hardware solution providers are:
portals and back-office.
Microsoft: Windows desktops on all parts. Windows servers, Biztalk and MS-SQL on EDI from garages.
Oracle: Provides the central SQL database and data warehouse.
IBM: Provides RISC servers and AIX on central processors.

Fares and regulations
As of January 1st, 2020, regular Bilhete Único users pay R$ 4.40 for up to four bus rides in a three-hour period. Boarding the rapid transit system or a train costs R$ 4.40. An integration between the systems allows for up to three bus rides and either a rapid transit or train ride in a three-hour period for R$ 7.65, provided that the user boards the rapid transit or train in the first two hours. Students and teachers pay half price, while persons with disabilities and seniors have free access.

Notes

References

Smart cards
Contactless smart cards
Fare collection systems
Payment systems
Transport in São Paulo